Judith Love Cohen (August 16, 1933 – July 25, 2016) was an American aerospace engineer. Cohen worked as an electrical engineer on the Minuteman missile, the science ground station for the Hubble Space Telescope, the Tracking and Data Relay Satellite, and the Apollo Space Program. After her retirement as an engineer, she founded a children's multimedia publishing company, eventually publishing more than 20 titles before her death in 2016. Cohen was the mother of computer scientist and engineer Neil Siegel and actor/musician Jack Black.

Early life and education 
Cohen was born into a Jewish family in Brooklyn, New York, the daughter of Sarah Cohen (née Roisman) and Morris Bernard Cohen. By fifth grade, her classmates were paying her to do their math homework. She was often the only girl in her math classes, and decided she wanted to become a math teacher. By age 19, she was both studying engineering in college, and dancing ballet in the Metropolitan Opera Ballet company in New York.

She received a scholarship to Brooklyn College to major in math, but realized she preferred engineering. After two years at Brooklyn College, Cohen married and moved to California, working as a junior engineer for North American Aviation, attending the 
University of Southern California (USC) at night; she said that she went through both her BS and MS programs at USC without ever meeting another female engineering student. She received both her bachelor's and master's degrees from USC Viterbi School of Engineering, in 1957 and 1962 respectively, and continued her association with the university, serving as an Astronautical Engineering Advisory board member.

In 1982, she became a graduate of the UCLA Engineering Executive Program.

Career 
Cohen's engineering career began in 1952, when she worked as a junior engineer at North American Aviation. After graduation from USC Viterbi School of Engineering in 1957, she went on to work at Space Technology Laboratories. Space Technology Laboratories eventually became TRW (acquired by Northrop Grumman in 2002). She stayed with the company until her retirement in 1990. Her engineering work included work on the guidance computer for the Minuteman missile and the Abort-Guidance System (AGS) in the Apollo Lunar Module. The AGS played an important role in the safe return of Apollo 13 after an oxygen tank explosion left the Service Module crippled and forced the astronauts to use the Lunar Module as a "lifeboat." Supplies of electrical power and water on the LM were limited and the Primary Guidance and Navigation System used too much water for cooling. As a result, after a major LM descent engine burn two hours past its closest approach to the Moon to shorten the trip home, the AGS was used for most of the return, including two mid-course corrections.pp. III-17,32,35,40 According to her son Neil, "My mother usually considered her work on the Apollo program to be the highlight of her career. When disaster struck the Apollo 13 mission, it was the Abort-Guidance System that brought the astronauts home safely. Judy was there when the Apollo 13 astronauts paid a 'thank you' to the TRW facility in Redondo Beach."

In 1990, after retiring from practice as an engineer, she began a publishing company called Cascade Pass with her third husband, David Katz. They published two series of books:

 The "You Can be a Woman … " series was created to encourage very young girls to pursue careers in science and engineering
 The "Green" series focuses on promoting positive environmental practices, aimed at young children. 

Cascade Pass has sold more than 100,000 of their children's books in these two series.

Cascade Pass also published a book called The Women of Apollo (written by Robyn Friend, Cohen's daughter-in-law), which features short biographies of four women who helped put the first man on the moon, Cohen among them.

Selected honors 
 May 2014, IEEE-USA Distinguished Literary Contributions Award – for her work with STEM for children

Personal life 
In the mid-1950s, Cohen married fellow engineer Bernard Siegel, whom she had met while she was a freshman in engineering school at Brooklyn College in Brooklyn, New York. They had three children: engineer/scientist Neil Siegel, Howard Siegel, and Rachel Siegel. The couple divorced in the mid-1960s.

In the mid-1960s, Cohen married Thomas "Tom" William Black, who converted to Judaism for her. In 1969, they had a son, Hollywood actor Jack Black. In a memorial tribute, her son Neil notes that she was troubleshooting problems with schematics on the day she went into labor, called her boss to let him know she had fixed the problem and then delivered Jack. The couple divorced in the late 1970s.

In the early 1980s, Cohen married David A. Katz. They had been married for 35 years at the time of Cohen's death, after a short battle with cancer in 2016.

In 1991, Cohen's son Howard died of AIDS at the age of 36.

Selected works and publications 
 A Clean series
 A Cleaner Port. A Brighter Future. The Greening of the Port of Los Angeles (co-authored with Robyn Friend)
 
 A Clean Planet: The Solar Power Story (co-authored with Robyn Friend)
 A Clean City: The Green Construction Story (co-authored with Robyn Friend)
 2007: A Clean Sky: The Global Warming Story (co-authored with Robyn Friend)
  – Spanish language translation of A Clean Sky: The Global Warming Story
 Future Engineering: The Clean Water Challenge (co-authored with Robyn Friend)
 Los Angeles Clean Energy Future (co-authored with Robyn Friend)
 Los Angeles Water Future (co-authored with Robyn Friend)
 A Clean Sea: The Rachel Carson Story
 You Can Be series
 2005: You Can Be a Woman Makeup Artist or Costume Designer (with Robyn Friend) 
 2004: You Can Be a Woman Animator (with Vicky Jenson) 
 1992: You Can Be a Woman Architect 
 1995: You Can Be a Woman Astronomer 
 1999: You Can Be a Woman Basketball Player 
 1999: You Can Be a Woman Botanist 
 1996: You Can Be a Woman Cardiologist 
 2005: You Can Be a Woman Chemist 
 1999: You Can Be a Woman Egyptologist 
 1995: You Can Be a Woman Engineer   
 2002: You Can Be a Woman Entomologist 
 2005: You Can Be a Woman Video Game Producer 
 2003: You Can Be a Woman Movie Maker 
 2001: You Can Be a Woman Marine Biologist 
 2002: You Can Be a Woman Meteorologist 
 1994: You Can Be a Woman Oceanographer (with Sharon E. Franks, Sharon Roth Franks) 
 1993: You Can Be a Woman Paleontologist  
 2000: You Can Be a Woman Soccer Player (with Tisha Lea Venturini) 
 2000: You Can Be a Woman Softball Player 
 1992: You Can Be a Woman Zoologist 
 Tu Puedes Ser series
 Tu Puedes Ser Una Ingeniera
 Tu Puedes Ser Una Arquitecta
 Tu Puedes Ser Biologa Marina
 Tu Puedes Ser Una Zoologa
 Tu Puedes Ser Una Oceanografa
 Other

References

External links 
 
 David A. Katz and Judith Love Cohen Papers at University of Southern Mississippi

1933 births
2016 deaths
American electrical engineers
University of Southern California alumni
Deaths from cancer in California
Place of death missing
Jewish American scientists
Jewish engineers
Brooklyn College alumni
Jewish women scientists
American aerospace engineers
Jewish women writers
American women engineers
American women children's writers
American children's writers
American non-fiction children's writers
American women non-fiction writers
Scientists from Brooklyn
Writers from Brooklyn
American non-fiction environmental writers
American science writers
Women science writers
21st-century American Jews
21st-century American women